"I Just Make Them Up, See!" is a comic science fiction poem by American writer Isaac Asimov, written in 1957. The poem is a monologue from a fan, asking Asimov how he comes up with his ideas. The question is not answered in the poem, but rather the title itself: I Just Make Them Up, See!

It was collected in the anthologies Nine Tomorrows, The Best Science Fiction of Isaac Asimov, and The Complete Stories.

External links 
 

Short stories by Isaac Asimov
1958 short stories